Álvaro Romero Morillo (born 17 May 1996) is a Spanish footballer who plays as a winger for Algeciras CF.

Club career
Born in Seville, Andalusia, Romero represented AD Nervión as a youth, featuring with the first-team during the 2013–14 campaign and scoring once in a 5–2 Segunda Andaluza home routing of AD Cerro del Águila. In August 2014, he moved to CD Diocesano and returned to youth football.

Ahead of the 2015–16 season, Romero joined Tercera División side CD Azuaga, being the club's top goalscorer with 20 goals. On 25 May 2016, he agreed to a contract with Arenas Club de Getxo of Segunda División B.

On 2 February 2017, Romero signed for Real Murcia also in the third division, being immediately loaned to fellow league team FC Jumilla until June. On 18 August, he moved to CD Badajoz in the same category.

On 21 July 2018, Romero joined Segunda División side Extremadura UD, being initially assigned to the reserves in the fourth division. He made his professional debut on 30 September, coming on as a second-half substitute for Chuli in a 2–2 home draw against Elche CF.

On 26 June 2019, Romero joined Unionistas de Salamanca CF in the third division. The following 23 January, he scored the equalizer in a Copa del Rey match against Real Madrid, but his side eventually lost 1–3.

On 14 September 2020, Romero was loaned to fellow third level side Algeciras CF for the season. The following 13 July, he signed permanently for the side, for a fee of € 25,000.

Personal life
Romero is a lifelong Sevilla FC supporter whose dream is to play for Sevilla, and also worked as a groundsman for Azuaga's stadium while playing for the club. His father Pedrito was also a footballer, playing for both Azuaga and AD Llerenense.

References

External links

1996 births
Living people
Footballers from Seville
Spanish footballers
Association football wingers
Segunda División players
Primera Federación players
Segunda División B players
Tercera División players
Arenas Club de Getxo footballers
Real Murcia players
FC Jumilla players
CD Badajoz players
Extremadura UD B players
Extremadura UD footballers
Unionistas de Salamanca CF players
Algeciras CF footballers